The Chagoda is a river in Leningrad Oblast, Russia, a left tributary of the Tigoda.

References

Rivers of Leningrad Oblast